Narmanjeles (also Romanized as Narmānjeles) is a village in Varavi Rural District, Varavi District, Mohr County, Fars Province, Iran. At the 2006 census, its population was 1,071, in 215 families.

References 

Populated places in Mohr County